Indians in Spain form one of the smaller populations of the Indian diaspora. According to the statistics of India's Ministry of External Affairs, they number only 35,000, or 0.07% of the population of Spain. 2009 statistics of Spain's Instituto Nacional de Estadística showed 35,686 Indian citizens in Spain; this figure does not include persons of Indian origin holding other citizenships. Most Indians originally migrated to Spain from Africa, while others came from India and even Japan and Southeast Asia. The overwhelming majority of Indians in Spain live in the Barcelona area (over 26,000 as of 2019).  According to data from 2021, Indians in Spain number more than 57,000 (0.12% of the total population).

Migration history 
Sindhi traders and shopkeepers thrived in the free ports of the Spanish Canary Islands of Las Palmas and Tenerife following the imposition of import and foreign exchange restrictions in Spain after World War II. They conducted a brisk trade with the North African continent from Las Palmas. When Ceuta and Melilla, parts of Spanish Morocco, were also declared as free ports, Indian businessmen set up trading houses and retail shops catering to the tourist trade.

The next wave of Indians to go to Spain were descendants of Indian labourers from former Spanish colony of Equatorial Guinea. By the mid-seventies, there were over 200 Indian trading houses in Ceuta and Melilla. With the liberalisation in import policies introduced in the eighties, business activity shifted to the port cities of Malaga and Barcelona. Madrid also attracted many Indian businessmen.

Religion 
Sindhis and Sikhs form the majority of the Indian community. Spain has recognised three entities of Hinduism. The community celebrates various Indian festivals. Rath Yatras are also taken out by members of the Hare Rama Hare Krishna movement with the enthusiastic support of the Indian community. There are temples in Valencia, Ceuta, and Canary Islands.

Business 
The Indian community in Spain enjoys a good reputation. Indians are considered hard working, non-political and peaceful. The Indian community has integrated well with Spanish society. There are many Indian restaurants in the island of Mallorca. 
The majority of Indian people living in Spain have their own business such as stores, restaurants, call centres, grocery stores, clothes store, construction firm, telecommunication shops, bar, dance and Bhangra groups etc.

Currently, the largest Hindu community in Spain is in the Canary Islands, especially on the island of Tenerife.

Several electronics and camera stores owned by Indians in the Canary Islands have been accused of being a fraud. In 2016 the Danish TV program "Svindlerjagt" (Eng: Swindler Hunt), went to Gran Canaria to expose several electronics stores which scammed Danish customers.

Spanish people of Indian descent 
 Sagar Prakash Khatnani, born in Tenerife, is a prolific writer of novels.
 Robert Masih Nahar, member of the Spanish senate
 Ma Anand Yashu, flutist
 Vashi Domínguez, entrepreneur
 Raimon Panikkar, priest and advocate of interfaith dialogue
 Prakash Sunderdas, economist and member of Ciudadanos.

See also 

 Hinduism in Spain
 Romani people in Spain
 India–Spain relations

References

Notes

Sources 

Ethnic groups in Spain
Asian diaspora in Spain
Spain
Spain